The IBM 610 Auto-Point Computer is one of the first personal computers, in the sense of a computer to be used by one person whose previous experience with computing might only have been with desk calculators. It was controlled interactively by a keyboard. The principal designer of this machine was John Lentz, as part of his work for the Watson Lab at Columbia University.

The IBM 610 was introduced in 1957. It was designed to be used in a normal office, without any special electrical or air conditioning requirements. It used vacuum tubes, a magnetic drum, and punched paper tape readers and punchers. The input was from a keyboard and output was to an IBM electric typewriter, at eighteen characters per second. It was one of the first (if not the first) computers to be controlled from a keyboard. The term "auto-point" referred to the ability to automatically adjust the decimal point in floating-point arithmetic.

Its price was $55,000, or it could be rented for $1150 per month ($460 academic). A total of 180 units were made. It was a slow and limited computer, and was generally replaced by the IBM 1620.

See also
List of vacuum-tube computers

References

External links
The IBM 610 Auto-Point Computer
IBM 610 Autopoint Computer 1961 BRL report
 IBM Archives: IBM 610 — Auto-Point Computer

 YouTube video

610
Computer-related introductions in 1957